Beata Island is a small island on the Caribbean Sea, located  southwest from Cape Beata.

History
Beata Island was discovered by Europeans during the second voyage of Christopher Columbus in 1494. Originally populated by Taíno natives, the island became a colonial asset of the Captaincy General of Santo Domingo and the greater Spanish Empire.  The island was the site of various military engagements between the Spanish and roving pirates.

Geography

The landscape is somewhat varied, with mangrove swamps on parts of the North shore, sandy coves and beaches on the west coast. Most of the interior of the island is covered by various subtypes of xeric semi-deciduous limestone forests. 

Geologically, the island is basically made out of limestone, the erosion of which causes very jagged surfaces on exposed rocks (called diente de perro or dogtooth), and several sinkholes and cenotes. It has a large population of rhinoceros iguanas. Beata Island is currently uninhabited, save for short stays by fishermen from the mainland and a permanent Dominican military base with rotating personnel
.

See also
Geography of the Dominican Republic

References 

 nautilusproject.com
 La República Dominicana by José E. Marcano

Uninhabited islands of the Dominican Republic
Geography of Pedernales Province